Yerin Ha is an Australian actress. She is best known for her role in the Paramount+ series Halo (2022–). She was named a 2021 rising star by the Casting Guild of Australia (CGA).

Early life
Ha was born in Sydney to Korean parents. Her grandmother also acts, and her parents met at drama school. At 15, Ha successfully auditioned for Kaywon High School of Arts in Seoul. She went on to graduate with a Bachelor of Fine Arts in Musical Theatre from Sydney's National Institute of Dramatic Art (NIDA) in 2018.

Career
Ha played Maurice alongside Mia Wasikowska and Eliza Scanlen in the 2019 Sydney Theatre Company production of Lord of the Flies at the Roslyn Packer Theatre. She made her television debut with a recurring role in the American-French series Reef Break.

In 2019, it was announced Ha had been cast in the Steven Spielberg-produced television adaptation of the video game Halo. Ha would play a new character Kwan Ha. The series premiered on Paramount+ in 2022. She was billed in the main cast of the ABC TV series Troppo as Ah Rah and made her feature film debut in Sissy, the latter of which premiered at the 2022 South by Southwest (SXSW). She will next star in the Stan series Bad Behaviour, a four-part adaptation of the novel of the same name by Rebecca Starford.

Filmography

Stage

References

External links
 

Living people
21st-century Australian actresses
Australian actresses of Asian descent
Australian people of South Korean descent
National Institute of Dramatic Art alumni
Year of birth missing (living people)